This list is of Billboard magazine's Top Hot 100 songs of 1968. The Top 100, as revealed in the edition of Billboard dated January 11, 1969  is based on Hot 100 charts from the issue dates of January 6 through December 14, 1968.

See also
1968 in music
List of Billboard Hot 100 number-one singles of 1968
List of Billboard Hot 100 top-ten singles in 1968

References

1968 record charts
Billboard charts